Shione Kaminaga (born 26 September 1999) is a Japanese short track speed skater. She competed in the 2018 and 2022 Winter Olympics.

References

1999 births
Living people
Japanese female short track speed skaters
Olympic short track speed skaters of Japan
Short track speed skaters at the 2018 Winter Olympics
Short track speed skaters at the 2022 Winter Olympics
Short track speed skaters at the 2016 Winter Youth Olympics
21st-century Japanese women